Elizaveta Igorevna Nugumanova (born 25 August 2002) is a Russian figure skater. She is the 2019 CS Warsaw Cup bronze medalist and has won two medals on the ISU Junior Grand Prix series.

Personal life 
Elizaveta Nugumanova was born on 25 August 2002 in Saint Petersburg, Russia.

Career

Early career
Nugumanova competed in the 2015 Russian Junior Championships where she finished fifth. The following season she competed in the Denkova-Staviski Cup, claiming the advanced novice gold medal. That same season she finished fourth at the 2016 Russian Junior Championships, behind Alisa Fedichkina.

Junior career

2016–2017 season 
Nugumanova made her debut in the Junior Grand Prix for the 2016-17 season. Her first event was the JGP Russia where she won the bronze medal. She won the silver medal in her second event at the JGP Estonia, earning personal best scores in the short and free skate with a total of 188.43 points. As the first substitute for the JGP Final, Nugumanova was called up when Polina Tsurskaya decided to withdraw. At the JGP Final she placed fifth. Nugumanova ended her season with an eleventh-place finish at the 2017 Russian Junior Championships.

Following the season, Nugumanova left her long-time coaches, Tatiana Mishina and Alexei Mishin, to train with Angelina Turenko.

2017–2018 season 
Nugumanova would place eleventh for the second consecutive year at the 2018 Russian Junior Championships.

Senior career

2018–2019 season 
Competing at the 2019 Russian Championships, Nugumanova's first senior nationals competition, she placed seventeenth.

Nugumanova would part ways with Angelina Turenko following that season to begin training under Evgeni Rukavicin.

2019–2020 season 
Making her senior international debut, Nugumanova win the bronze medal at the 2019 CS Warsaw Cup behind Ekaterina Kurakova and Bradie Tennell. She then went on to finish fourteenth at the 2020 Russian Championships.

2020–2021 season 
Due to the ongoing COVID-19 pandemic, a large number of modifications were made to the 2020–21 Grand Prix structure. The competitors at the 2020 Rostelecom Cup consisted only of skaters from Russia, skaters already training in the host nation, and skaters assigned to that event for geographic reasons. Nugumanova was thus chosen as one of the Russian skaters to participate at the event, where she finished fifth of the eleven skaters.

Nugumanova would then compete at the 2021 Russian Championships a couple of months later, finishing in sixth-place.

2021–2022 Season and Injury 
During the 2021–22 figure skating season, Nugumanova struggled with numerous health problems, including a nagging back injury that kept her out of competitions for the whole season.

In the spring of 2022, she would switch coaches from Evgeni Rukavicin to Elena Sokolova. Following this split, Nugumanova alleged that Rukavicin and his staff had constantly bullied her about her weight throughout her time training under him. She also stated that Rukavicin would threaten her into submission by saying that he would "use his connections" to end her figure skating career. Moreover, Nugumanova claimed that Valentin Molotov, one of her choreographers that worked alongside Rukavicin, had once threatened to kill her.

Programs

Competitive highlights 
GP: Grand Prix; CS: Challenger Series; JGP: Junior Grand Prix

Detailed results

Senior level

Junior level

References

External links 

 
 

2002 births
Living people
Russian female single skaters
Figure skaters from Saint Petersburg